The following buildings and structures are related to The Coca-Cola Company or their bottlers. , 900 factories and bottleries served the company and many buildings formerly used by the company have been added to heritage registers.

During the early 20th century Coca-Cola's in-house architect,  Jesse M. Shelton, used a compendium of architectural styles but typically included elaborate flourishes including Coke bottle designs in the facades to help promote the company's image. During the depression in the 1930s, Coca-Cola often spent $500,000–$600,000 on elaborate bottling plants but, because they are commercial buildings, traditional architects have often overlooked their beauty.

Atlanta, Georgia, architects Pringle and Smith designed buildings and created standardized designs for Coca-Cola bottling plants, including one located in Tifton Residential Historic District:The 1937 Tifton Coca-Cola Bottling Plant is located at 820 Love Avenue. The building is a two-story, brick, commercial Beaux Arts-style building with tile roof, heavy modillions under the cornice, metal factory sash-windows, leaded-glass transoms over plate glass display windows, and decorative cast-concrete door surround. Terra-cotta panels with the trademark "Coca Cola" emblem are located on the façade and side elevations. Designed by the Atlanta architectural firm Pringle and Smith, the building is an example of "Standardized Coca Cola Bottling Plant, Model 3A." Between 1928 and the late 1940s, Pringle and Smith designed a series of plans for bottling plant franchises for the Coca-Cola Company that were built throughout the southeastern United States.

United States

Other countries

Gallery

References

Lists of buildings and structures
Corporation-related lists
Building and structures